Thanks to Johnny Logan's win in Brussels in 1987, the 1988 Eurovision Song Contest was to be held in Dublin. The song "Take Him Home", written and composed by Peter Eades and performed by Jump The Gun was chosen to represent Ireland after winning the national final selection.

Before Eurovision

Eurosong '88 
Held on 6 March 1988 at the Olympia Theatre in Dublin, the national final, Eurosong '88 was hosted for the second year in succession by Marty Whelan (who would provide commentary for RTÉ's broadcast of the contest from 2000 onwards, although he did provided the TV commentary once before, in 1987), and Maxi, who had represented Ireland as a soloist in the 1973 Eurovision Song Contest, and again as part of the group Sheeba in 1981. Eight songs competed in the event, and the winner was selected by a panel of twelve "experts," each of whom awarded each song a score from one to eight points. One member of the panel was Sandy Kelly who had represented Ireland in the 1982 Eurovision Song Contest as a member of The Duskeys.

Liam Reilly would go on to represent Ireland in the 1990 Eurovision Song Contest (finishing joint 2nd with France). Reilly would also compose the Irish entry in 1991.

At Eurovision
"Take Him Home" was performed tenth in the running order on the night of the contest, following Switzerland and preceding Germany. At the close of the voting sequence, the song had received 79 points, placing eighth out of 21 songs.

Mike Murphy was providing the commentary for RTÉ 1 viewers, whilst Larry Gogan was commentating for listeners on RTÉ Radio 1. John Skehan was acting as spokesperson for the Irish jury.

Voting

References

External links
Irish national Final 1988 page

1988
Countries in the Eurovision Song Contest 1988
Eurovision
Eurovision